Attorney General Reid may refer to:

George Reid (1845–1918), Attorney General of New South Wales
George Reid (Victorian politician) (1903–1993), Attorney-General of Victoria
Robert Reid, 1st Earl Loreburn (1846–1923), Attorney General for England and Wales

See also
Inez Smith Reid (born 1937), Corporation Counsel of the District of Columbia (predecessor office to the Attorney General)
Attorney General Reed (disambiguation)
General Reid (disambiguation)